Martin Watier (born October 25, 1973) is a Canadian actor born in Montreal. Specialized in dubbing, he is, among other things, the official French voice of many  actors such as Colin Farrell, Jude Law, Jake Gyllenhaal, James Franco, Ryan Phillippe, Josh Hartnett, and Ben Foster.

Early life
Born in Montreal, Watier started studying music at the age of five. During his high school years, his passion for acting developed: in 1985 he begins studies in drama with Quebec actors Normand d’Amour and Henri Chassé.

In 1990, his background in music (piano and voice) along with his talent as a young actor earned him a scholarship to Upper Canada College, in Toronto, where he spent the next two years studying acting and musical theatre. In 1992, he was awarded the Robertson Davies Drama Award for «outstanding onstage performance» for his interpretation of Amadeus in Peter Shaffer's Amadeus.

Career

Film and theater
He returned to Montreal in 1993 to launch his professional career. There he studied acting, singing and dancing with teachers such as Warren Robertson, Estelle Esse and Danielle Hotte. In a short time, Watier landed various parts in plays and musicals (Jeanne, Bang Boy, Bang, Jerusalem), on English television (University, Sirens, The Hunger, Student Bodies) and French television (Watatatow, Zap, Catherine, 3 X rien, Annie et ses hommes), and in movies (Hemingway : A Portrait, Laserhawk, The Deception Trilogy, Polytechnique), and in numerous commercials.

Dubbing
In 1995 he discovered voice work. Since then, he regularly worked in the field of dubbing, narration and animation. Lending his voice to foreign actors, but also to fantastic characters and cartoons, he is able to give free rein to his creativity and overflowing imagination. Over the years, he became the official French voice of many American actors including Colin Farrell, Jude Law, Jake Gyllenhaal, James Franco, Ryan Phillippe, Josh Hartnett, and Ben Foster.

Watier dubbed for feature films (Star Wars: Episode II – Attack of the Clones, 54, Black Hawk Down, Capote, Brokeback Mountain, Pirates of the Caribbean), TV series (Ally McBeal, Tales of the City), documentaries (Canal Z, Canal Vie, Canal D, Historia, Canal V) and lent his voice to more than fifty cartoon characters (The Simpsons, The Hunchback of Notre Dame, The Lion King, Titan AE, The Incredibles, Monsters vs. Aliens, Open Season, Happy Feet, The Croods, Turbo,  Epic).

Theater and musicals
 Le Royaume des Devins : Cal
 Jerusalem, The Musical : Hassan
 Jeanne : Bastard of Orleans
 Bang Boy, Bang : Rod
 Amadeus : Amadeus

Filmography

Movie 

 The Deception (Trilogy) : Bill
 Hemingway: A Portrait : Hemingway

Television

Television series
 3 X Rien : Francis
 Annie et ses hommes : Jean-Yves
 University : Sébastien
 Catherine : Stéphane
 Are you Afraid of the Dark? : Jacques
 Student Bodies : DJ
 La Courte Échelle : Gorgo
 The Hunger II : Tony
 The Hunger : Jean-Pierre
 Sirens : Sean Jenkins
 Zap : Gustave

Television films
 Audrey Hepburn : Gaston
 The Patty Duke Show Reunion : Anthony Baker
 Fabulous Showman P.T. Barnum : Johnson
 The War of 1812 : Richardson
 Crosswinds : Ollie

French dubbing

Film

Feature films 

 Colin Farrell
 2020 The Gentlemen : Coach
 2019 Dumbo : Holt Farrier
 2018 Widows : Jack Mulligan
 2017 The Killing of a Sacred Deer : Steven Murphy
 2017 Roman J. Israel, Esq.: George Pierce
 2016 Les animaux fantastiques (Fantastic Beasts) : Graves
 2014 Conte d'hiver (Winter's Tale) : Peter Lake
 2013 Sauvons M. Banks (Saving Mr. Banks) : Robert Goff Travers
 2013 Mort et Enterré (Dead Man Down) : Victor
 2013 Épique (Epic) (voix) : Ronin
 2012 Les Psychopathes (Seven Psychopaths) : Marty
 2012 Total Recall : Mémoires Programmées (Total Recall) : Doug Quaid/Hauser
 2011 Vampire, vous avez-dit vampire? (Fright Night) : Jerry Dandrige
 2011 Méchants Patrons (Horrible Bosses) : Bobby Pellitt
 2010 Les chemins de la liberté (The Way Back) : Valka
 2009 Crazy Heart : Tommy Sweet
 2009 Ondine : Syracuse
 2008 En toute loyauté (Pride and Glory) : Jimmy Egan
 2008 Bienvenue à Bruges (In Bruges) : Ray
 2006 Deux Flics à Miami (Miami Vice) : James "Sonny" Crocket
 2005 Le Nouveau Monde (The New World) : John Smith
 2004 Alexandre (Alexander) : Alexander
 2003 Intermède (Intermission) : Lehiff
 2003 S.W.A.T : Jim Street
 2003 Le Nouvel Agent (The Recruit) : James Clayton
 2001 Hors-la-loi Américains (American Outlaws) : Jesse James
 Josh Hartnett
 2020 Target Number One : Victor Malarek 
 2008 August : Tom Sterling
 2007 Sortis de l'ombre (Resurrecting the Champ) : Erik Kernan
 2007 30 jours de nuit (30 Days of Night) : Eben Oleson
 2006 Le Dahlia noir (The Black Dahlia) : Dwight « Bucky » Bleichert
 2006 Bonne Chance Slevin (Lucky Number Slevin) : Slevin Kelevra
 2005 Mozart et la Baleine (Mozart and the Whale) : Donald Morton
 2005 Une histoire de Sin City (Sin City) : The Man
 2004 L'Appartement (Wicker Park) : Matthew
 2003 Hollywood Homicide : K. C. Calden
 2002 40 jours et 40 nuits (40 Days and 40 Nights) : Matt Sullivan
 2001 La Chute du Faucon Noir (Black Hawk Down) : le sergent Matt Eversmann
 2001 La Ronde des cocus (Town and Country) : Tom  Stoddard
 2001 Coup de Peigne (Blow Dry) : Brian Allen
 1999 Cri Ultime (The Virgin Suicides) : Trip Fontaine
 1998 Les Enseignants (The Faculty) : Zeke Tyler
 Ryan Phillippe
 2011 Braqueurs (Setup) : Vincent
 2011 La Défense Lincoln (The Lincoln Lawyer) : Louis Roulet
 2010 Le Bang Bang Club (The Bang Bang Club) : Greg Marinovich
 2010 MacGruber : Lt. Dixon Piper
 2007 Brèche (Breach) : Eric O'Neill
 2006 Échec et Mort (Five Fingers) : Martin
 2004 Crash : Officer Hanson
 2002 Igby en chute libre (Igby Goes Down) : Oliver "Ollie" Slocumb
 2001 Antitrust : Milo Hoffman
 1999 Un Pari Cruel (Cruel Intentions) : Sebastian Valmont
 1998 Couples à la Dérive (Playing by Heart) : Keenan
 1998 54 (54) : Shane O'Shea
 Jude Law
 2020 The Nest : Rory O'Hara
 2020 The Rhythm Section : Boyd
 2019 Capitaine Marvel (Captain Marvel) : Yon-Rogg
 2017 Le Roi Arthur : La Légende d'Excalibur  (King Arthur: Legend of the Sword ) : Vortigern
 2016 Genius : Thomas Wolfe
 2015 Spy : Bradley Fine
 2013 Effets secondaires (Side Effects) : Jonathan Banks
 2012 Anna Karénine (Anna Karenina) : Alexei Karénine
 2011 Sherlock Holmes : Le Jeu des ombres (Sherlock Holmes: A Game of Shadows) : Dr John Watson
 2011 Hugo : Hugo's Father
 2011 Contagion : Alan Krumwiede
 2010 Repreneurs (Repo Men) : Remy
 2009 Sherlock Holmes : Dr John Watson
 2009 L'Imaginarium du docteur Parnassus (The Imaginarium of Doctor Parnassus) : Tony (2e métamorphose)
 2006 Les Vacances (The Holiday) : Graham
 2004 L'Aviateur (The Aviator) : Errol Flynn
 2004 Alfie : Alfie
 2003 Retour à Cold Mountain (Cold Mountain) : Inman
 Paul Walker
 2015 Dangereux 7 (Furious 7) : Brian O'Connor
 2013 Rapides et Dangereux 6 (Fast & Furious 6) : Brian O'connor
 2013 Aucun détour (Vehicle 19) : Michael Woods
 2011 Rapides et Dangereux 5 (Fast Five) : Brian O'Connor
 2009 Rapides et Dangereux (Fast & Furious) : Brian O'Connor
 2007 Bobby Z : Tim Kearney
 2005 Bleu d'enfer (Into the Blue) : Jared
 2003 Rapides et Dangereux 2 (2 Fast 2 Furious) : Brian O'Connor
 2001 Virée d'Enfer (Joy Ride) : Lewis Thomas
 2001 Rapide et Dangereux (The Fast and the Furious) : Brian O'Connor
 2000 Le Clan des Skulls (The Skulls) : Caleb Mandrake
 1999 Les Pros du Collège (Varsity Blues) : Lance Harbor
 1999 Voici les Deedles (Meet the Deedles) : Phil Deedle
 James Franco
 2017 The Disaster Artist : Tommy / Johnny
 2016 Pourquoi lui (Why Him?) : Laird Mayhew
 2014 Good People : Tom Wright
 2013 Homefront : Gater
 2013 Oz le Magnifique (Oz the Great and Powerful) : Oz
 2011 La Montée de la Planète des Singes (Rise of the Planet of the Apes) : Will Rodman
 2010 127 Heures (127 Hours) : Aron Ralston
 2008 Milk : Scott Smith
 2008 Le Temps d'un ouragan (Nights in Rodanthe) : Mark Flanner
 2008 Ananas Express (Pineapple Express) : Saul Silver
 2006 L'Escadrille Lafayette (Flyboys) : Blaine Rawlings
 2006 Tristan et Yseult (Tristan & Isolde) : Tristan
 2005 Le Grand Raid (The Great Raid) : Captain Prince
 2002 Une Ville près de la mer (City by the Sea) : Joey
 Jason Priestley
 2010 Fitz (Call Me Fitz) : (TV series) : Richard Fitzpatrick
 2004 Enjeux sur Glace (Chicks with Sticks) : Steve Cooper
 2003 Sombres Secrets (Dark Drive (Darkness Falling)) : Micheal Pacer
 2002 Au Rythme de l'amour (Fancy Dancing) : Asa Gemmil
 2001 Zigs (Double Down) : David
 2000 Le Lion d'Oz (Lion of Oz) (voix) : Lion
 2000 Pourchassé (The Highwayman) : Breakfast
 1999 Voyeur (Eye of the Beholder) : Gary
 1997 Amour et Mort à Long Island (Love and Death on Long Island) : Ronnie Bostock
 Jake Gyllenhaal
 2019 Spider-Man: Loin des siens (Spider-Man: Far From Home) : Quentin Beck / Mysterio
 2017 Stronger : Jeff Bauman
 2017 James Dean-la naissance d'une légende (Life) : David Jordan
 2016 Animaux Nocturnes (Nocturnal Animals) : Tony Hastings/Edward Sheffield
 2016 Démolition (Demolition) : Davis Mitchell
 2015 Le Gaucher (Southpaw) : Billy Hope   
 2014 Ennemi (Enemy) : Adam et Anthony
 2013 Prisonniers (Prisoners) : Detective Loki
 2012 La Force de l'ordre (End of Watch) : Brian Taylor
 2011 Code Source (Source Code) : Colter Stevens
 2009 Frères (Brothers) : Tommy Cahill
 2007 Détention secrète (Rendition) : Douglas Freeman
 2005 Souvenirs de Brokeback Mountain (Brokeback Mountain) : Jack Twist
 2005 La Preuve Irréfutable (Proof) : Hal
 2002 Déroute (Highway) : Pilot Kelson
 Kevin Hart
 2019 Jumanji : Le prochain niveau (Jumanji : The Next Level) : Mouse Finbar / Fridge
 2018 Sous un autre jour (The Upside) : Dell
 2018 Night School : Teddy
 2017 Jumanji : Fridge
 2016 Agents presque secrets (Central Intelligence) : Calvi
 2016 Mise à l'épreuve 2 (Ride Along 2) : Ben Barber
 2015 Prison 101 (Get Hard) : Darnell Lewis
 2013 Grudge Match : Dante Slate Jr
 2008 Film de super-héros (Superhero Movie) : Trey
 2008 Chasse au Trésor (Fool's Gold) : Big Bunny
 2008 Ados Extrêmes (Extreme Movie) : Barry
 2006 Le Dernier Combat (The Last Stand) : F Stop/G Spot
 2006 Film de Peur 4 (Scary Movie 4) : CJ
 2004 Voici Polly (Along Came Polly) : Vic
 2003 Film de Peur 3 (Scary Movie 3) : CJ
 Mark Wahlberg
 2018 Mile 22 : Silva
 2017 Transformers : Le dernier chevalier (Transformers: The Last Knight) : Cade Yeager
 2017 Le jour des Patriotes (Patriots Day) : Tommy Saunders
 2016 Deepwater Horizon : Mike Williams
 2015 Ted 2 : John Bennett
 2014 Transformers: Age of Extinction : Cade Yeager
 2013 Quitte ou Double (2 Guns) : Marcus "Stig" Stigman
 2012 Ted : John Bennett
 2010 Le Coup de grâce (The Fighter) : Mickey Ward
 2008 Max Payne : Max Payne
 2006 Agents Troubles (The Departed) : Dignam
 2005 Quatre Frères (Four Brothers) : Bobby Mercer
 1997 Nuits Endiablées (Boogie Nights) : Eddie Adams/Dirk Diggler
 Ben Foster
 2016 Warcraft : Medivh
 2012 Contrebande (Contraband) : Sebastian Abney
 2011 Le Mécano (The Mechanic) : Steve McKenna
 2009 Le Messager (The Messenger) : le sergent Will Montgomery
 2007 3 h 10 pour Yuma (3:10 to Yuma) : Charlie Prince
 2006 Mâle Alpha (Alpha Dog) : Jake Mazursky
 2005 Otages de la Peur (Hostage) : Mars Krupcheck
 2004 Le Punisher : Les Liens du Sang (The Punisher) : Spacker Dave
 2001 Songe d'une Nuit d'Ados (Get Over It) : Berke Landers
 Hugh Dancy
 2019 Fin de soirée  (Late Night) : Charlie Fain
 2011 Martha Marcy May Marlene : Ted
 2011 Notre idiot de frère (My Idiot Brother) : Christian
 2009 Adam : Adam Raki
 2009 Confessions d'une accro du shopping (Confessions of a Shopaholic) : Luke Brandon
 2007 Sang et Chocolat (Blood & Chocolate) : Aiden
 2006 Basic Instinct 2 : Adam Towers
 2004 Ella l'Ensorcellée (Ella Enchanted) : Char
 Orlando Bloom
 2007 Pirates des Caraïbes : Jusqu'au bout du Monde (Pirates of the Caribbean: At World's End) : Will Turner
 2006 Pirates des Caraïbes : Le Coffre du Mort (Pirates of the Caribbean: Dead Man's Chest) : Will Turner
 2005 Elizabethtown : Drew Baylor
 2004 Havre (Haven) : Shy
 2004 Troie (Troy) : Paris
 2003 Pirates des Caraïbes : La Malédiction de la Perle Noire (Pirates of the Caribbean: The Curse of the Black Pearl) : Will Turner
 Chris Klein
 2009 Street Fighter: La Légende de Chun-Li (Street Fighter: The Legend of Chun-Li) : Charlie Nash
 2006 American Dreamz : William Williams
 2005 Un Long Week-End (The Long Weekend) : Cooper
 2002 Nous étions soldats (We Were Soldiers) : 2nd Lt. Jack Geoghegan
 2002 Rollerball : Jonathan Cross
 2001 Dites-moi que je rêve  (Say It Isn't So) : Gilbert Noble
 Freddie Prinze Jr.
 2007 Au Royaume désenchanté (Happily N'Ever After) (voix) : Rick
 2004 Scooby-Doo 2 : Monstres en liberté (Scooby-Doo 2: Monsters Unleashed) : Fred Jones
 2002 Scooby-Doo : Fred Jones
 2000 Des Gars, des Filles (Boys and Girls) : Ryan Walker
 2000 La Fille de mes Rêves (Down to You) : Alfred 'Al' Connelly
 1999 Elle a Tout pour Elle (She's All That) : Zach Siler
 Johnny Knoxville
 2016 Skiptrace : Connor Watts
 2013 Le Dernier Combat (The Last Stand) : Lewis Dinkum
 2005 La vie secrète de Dalty Calhoun (Daltry Calhoun) : Daltry Calhoun
 2005 Shérif, fais-moi peur (The Dukes of Hazzard) : Luke Duke
 2005 Les Seigneurs de Dogtown (Lords of Dogtown) : Topper Burks
 2004 Justice Sauvage (Walking Tall) : Ray Templeton
 2002 Les Voyous de Brooklyn (Deuces Wild) : Vinnie Fish
 James Marsden
 2020 Sonic the Hedgehog : Tom Wachowski 
 2015 Grizzly : Rowan
2014 The Best of Me : Dawson Cole
 2008 Plein Gaz (Sex Drive) : Rex
 2007 Il Était Une Fois (Enchanted) : Prince Edward
 2007 Hairspray : Corny Collins
 2004 Les Pages de notre amour (The Notebook) : Lon Hammond Jr.
 2000 Commérages (Gossip) : Derrick Webb
Hill Harper 
 2017 All Eyez on Me : Interviewer
 2015 Commotion (Concussion) : Christopher Jones
 2015 Le garçon d'à côté (The Boy Next Door) : Principal Edward Warren
 2008 A Good Man Is Hard to Find : Damion Marshall 
 2003 L’amour en chair et en os (Love, Sex and Eating the Bones) : Michael 
 1999 Infiltration (In Too Deep) : Breezy T. 
 Ryan Reynolds
 2020 The Croods: A New Age (voix) : Guy
 2013 Turbo (voix) : Turbo
 2013 Les Croods (The Croods) (voix) : Guy
 2009 La Proposition (The Proposal) : Andrew Paxton
 2005 Amityville : La Maison du Diable (The Amityville Horror) : George Lutz
 2004 Blade 3 la Trinité (Blade: Trinity) : Hannibal King
 Lochlyn Munro 
 2014 Monsieur Hockey :L'histoire de Gordie Howe (Mr. Hockey: The Gordie Howe Story) : Bobby Hull
 2004 De Vrais Hommes (The Wild Guys) : Randall
 2003 Typiquement Masculin (A Guy Thing) : Ray Donovan
 2002 Global Heresy: Au Coeur du Rock (Rock My World) : Dave
 2000 Film de Peur (Scary Movie) : Greg Phillippe
 Chris Pine
 2018 Un raccourci dans le temps (A Wrinkle in Time) : Dr. Alex Murry
 2016 Star Trek Sans Limites (Star Trek Beyond) : James T. Kirk
 2016 Les Heures de Gloire (The Finest Hours) : Bernie Webber
 2013 Star Trek : Vers les Ténèbres (Star Trek Into Darkness) : James T. Kirk
 2009 Star Trek : James T. Kirk
 Jason Bateman
 2009 Couples en Vacances (Couples Retreat) : Jason Smith
 2009 L'invention du mensonge (The Invention of Lying) : Doctor
 2009 Jeux de pouvoir (State of Play) : Dominic Foy
 2007 L'Ex (The Ex) : Chip Sanders
 Jared Leto
 2007 Coeurs Perdus (Lonely Hearts) : Ray Fernandez
 2005 Seigneur de Guerre (Lord of War) : Vitaly Orlov
 2000 Retour à Brooklyn (Requiem for a Dream) : Harry Goldfarb
 1999 Fight Club : Angel Face
 Hayden Christensen
 2019 Star Wars: Épisode IX : L'Ascension de Skywalker (Star Wars: The Rise of Skywalker) : Anakin Skywalker
 2018 Little Italy : Leo Campo
 2017 First Kill : Will
 2006 Portrait d'une Muse (Factory Girl) : Billy Quinn 'Musician'
 2005 La Guerre des Étoiles, épisode III : La Revanche des Sith (Star Wars: Episode III – Revenge of the Sith) : Anakin Skywalker
 2002 La Guerre des Étoiles, épisode II : L'Attaque des clones (Star Wars: Episode II – Attack of the Clones) : Anakin Skywalker
 Joe Manganiello
 2015 Magic Mike XXL : Big Dick Richie
 2014 Sabotage : Joe 'Grinder' Phillips
 2012 Magic Mike  : Big Dick Richie
 Tygh Runyan
 1999 L'Ange Gardien de mon Père (My Father's Angel) : Enes
 1999 Jeunesse en Folie (Kitchen Party) : Wayne
 Adrian Grenier
 2016 Marauders : Wells
 2006 Le Diable s'habille en Prada (The Devil Wears Prada) : Nate
 1999 Fais-Moi Craquer (Drive Me Crazy) : Chase Hammond
 Matt Damon
 2002 Une Soirée Parfaite (The Third Wheel) : Kevin
 2000 Titan (Après la Terre) (Titan A.E.) (voix) : Cale Tucker
 Joseph Gordon-Levitt
 2005 Brick : Brendan
 2002 La Planète au Trésor (Treasure Planet) (voix) : Jim Hawkins
 Nick Stahl
 2008 Réveil inattendu (Sleepwalking) : James
 2003 Twist : Dodge
 Paul Rudd
 2013 Admission : John Pressman
 2007 L'Escouade Reno 911 à Miami (Reno 911!: Miami) : Ethan the Drug Lord
 Elijah Wood
 2011 Les Petits Pieds du Bonheur 2 (Happy Feet 2) (voix) : Mumble
 2006 Les Petits Pieds du Bonheur (Happy Feet) (voix) : Mumble
 Taylor Kitsch
 2019 Poursuite sous pression (21 Bridges) : Ray
 2012 John Carter : John Carter
 2012 Bataille Navale (Battleship) : Alex Hopper
 Adam Levine
 2014 Begin Again : Dave
 Taylor Kinney
 2016 La Forêt (The Forest) : Aiden
 2002 Nicholas Nickleby : Nicholas Nickelby (Charlie Hunnam)
 2005 Capote : Truman Capote (Philip Seymour Hoffman)
 2006 Le Retour de Superman (Superman Returns) : Clark Kent/Superman (Brandon Routh)
 2009 Brüno : Brüno (Sacha Baron Cohen)
 2009 Max et les Maximonstres (Where the Wild Things Are): Alexander (Paul Dano) (voix)
 2010 Mon nom est Khan (My Name Is Khan) : Rizvan Khan (Shah Rukh Khan)

Animation films 

 L'Étoile de Noël (The Star) : Bo (Steven Yeun)
 Les Trolls (Trolls) : Branch (Justin Timberlake)
 Turbo : Turbo (Ryan Reynolds)
 Epique : La Bataille du royaume secret (Epic) : Ronin (Colin Farrell)
 Les Croods (The Croods) : Guy (Ryan Reynolds)
 Rebelle (Brave) : The Crow (Steve Purcell)
 Monstres contre Aliens (Monsters vs. Aliens) : Gallaxhar (Rainnn Wilson)
 Les Rebelles de la forêt et Les Rebelles de la forêt 2 (Open Season 1 & 2) : Elliot (Ashton Kutcher)
 Planète 51 (Planet 51) : (Glar Alan Marriott)
 Lilo et Stitch, Lilo et Stitch 2 et Stitch ! Le film : Stitch (Chris Sanders)
 Les Petits Pieds du Bonheur 1 et 2 (Happy Feet & Happy Feet Two) : Mumble (Elijah Wood)
 Les Incroyable (The Incredibles) : Incroyable Ado et Syndrome (Jason Lee)
 Le Bossu de Notre-Dame et Le Bossu de Notre-Dame 2 (The Hunchback of Notre Dame 1 & 2) : Quasimodo (Tom Hulce)
 Le Roi lion 2 : La Fierté de Simba (The Lion King II: Simba's Pride) : Kovu (Jason Marsden)

Television

Cartoon voices 

 Agent Jean : WXT, Crémeux, Moignon
 Dounia : Ay
 Les Simpson (The Simpsons) : Jimbo, Dolph, Lou, Rainier Wolfcastle, Drederick Tatum, Jesus ....
 Cochon Dingue/Dingue Académie : Arthur le Hérisson, Gervais le Rat, Claude la Tortue
 16 Hudson : Monsieur K
 Mouvement Deluxe : Keven
 Supernoobs : Memnok
 Ruby Gloom : Osso Bécot
 Sacré Andy ! : Andy
 La Clique (Undergrads) : Cal
 Les Décalés du cosmos (Tripping the Rift) : Flip
 Détentionnaires : Chaz Moneranian
 Wapos Bay : Talon
 Clone Wars : Anakin Skywalker
 Total Drama Revenge Island : Du Tonnerre
 Inuk : Kimik
 Stoked : Reef
 Magi-Nation : Tcheur & Ugger
 Prezzy : Prezzy
 Nez de Fer : Charmant
 Bip et Bouton (Bolts & Blip) : Bip
 Rick & Steve (Rick et Steve) : Rick

Cartoon - original voices 

 Les Enfants du feu : Artor
 Lola et Virginia : Hugo
 Air Academy : Alex
 Jim Bouton : Oris
 Porc Cité : Raphael
 Winx Club : Helia

Television series and reality shows
 Expedition Unleashed (2020) : Steve Backshall
 Flipping 101 (2020) : Tarek El Moussa
 Very Scary People (2020) : Donnie Wahlberg
 The Block 13 (2019-2020) : Ronnie Caceres
 Repousser la Mort (2019-2020) : Timothy Caulfield
 TKO: Total Knock Out (2019) : Kevin Hart
 Swamp People (2016-2019) : Chase Landry
 Flip or Flop (2014-2018) : Tarek El Moussa
 World of Dance (2017-2019) : No Ye
 Hank Ziper (2016-2017) : Mr Love
 Blackstone (2015) : Victor Merasty

Documentary-narration 

 2017 : Escobar
 2017 : Haute Sécurité
 2016–2017 : Jean-Lemire
 2016 : Dieux du Ciel
 2016 : Les Colocataires
 2016 : Hélico tout terrain
 2015 Mummies Alive
 2015 Air Show
 2002–2018 Rallye Autour du Monde
 2014 Cuff Me If You Can
 2014 Méthane
 2013 Hélico Tout Terrain
 2012 Maigrir ou Mourir
 2012 Fashion Star
 2012 Swarm Chasers
 2011 Mangrove
 2011 Dating in the Dark
 2011 Top Ten
 2011 Eaten Alive
 2009–2010 Dive Detective
 2010 Gasland
 2008 Pilotes des Glaces

Audio Book
 2020 Bernard Landry - L'héritage d'un patriote : Jean-Yves Duthel, aux éditions Libre Expression
 2020 N'essuie jamais de larmes sans gants : Jonas Gardell, aux éditions Alto
 2020 Tristan au stade des champions : Étienne Poirier, aux éditions Héritage / Dominique et compagnie
 2020 Escapades virtuelles : Jessica Wilcott, aux éditions Foulire
 2020 Collé : Jean Lacombe, aux éditions Soulières éditeur
 2020 ''Medical medium : Anthony William, aux éditions Trédaniel

House voice
 2016–2019 Audioguides du Musée des beaux-arts de Montréal 2014–2020 L'Orchestre symphonique de Montréal 2016 Le Gala du cinéma québécois 2014–2015 La soirée des Jutra Videogames 
 2012 : Skylanders: Giants : Spyro le Dragon
 2012 : Assassin's Creed III : Gilbert du Motier de La Fayette
 2011 : Skylanders: Spyro's Adventure : Spyro le Dragon
 2011 : Assassin's Creed: Revelations'' : Soliman le Magnifique

References

External links 
 
 https://agencerbl.com/talents/martin-watier
 

Living people
1973 births
Canadian male video game actors
Canadian male voice actors
Canadian male television actors
21st-century Canadian male actors
20th-century Canadian male actors
Male actors from Montreal